Scream! was a British weekly horror comic anthology that was published for 15 issues by IPC Magazines in 1984.

Controversy over horror comics had led to the introduction of the Children and Young Persons (Harmful Publications) Act 1955, under which the first prosecution occurred in 1970. The editorial approach to Scream! was to de-emphasise the horror label and deliberately not repeat the style of its more controversial precursors, making it more tongue-in-cheek for younger readers, as evidenced by its coverline "not for the nervous".

List of stories
Stories included:

The Dracula File —  the lead strip, about Dracula hunting in 1980s England. Written mainly by Gerry Finley-Day and occasionally written by Simon Furman.
The Thirteenth Floor —  Scream!s most popular strip, concerning Max, a crazed computer, in charge of an elevator in a 17-storey apartment building - when someone bad or evil steps inside, Max would take them to The Thirteenth Floor, a virtual reality where they would be tormented or killed. It continued in Eagle for several years after the demise of Scream!. The first 11 episodes were reprinted in Hibernia Books' 2007 collection The Thirteenth Floor; the first 48 episodes were reprinted by Rebellion in 2018. Originally written by John Wagner and Alan Grant (under the pseudonym Ian Holland).
Fiends and Neighbours —  a reprint from a more mainstream IPC comic Cor!!, about a family of monsters living next door to an ordinary couple.
A Ghastly Tale —  one-off strips introduced by the comic's fictional editor, Ghastly.
Library of Death —  one-off morality tales.
Monster —  serial about a deformed man ('Uncle Terry') who grew up locked in an attic, similar to the Monster of Glamis. The strip borrowed from the 'gentle monster on the run' archetype as espoused by the Hulk, as Terry inevitably escaped, tending to murder people he didn't like due to his inhuman strength and lack of social restraint. The script for the first instalment was credited to Alan Moore, with subsequent scripts credited to "Rick Clark", a pseudonym of John Wagner. After Scream! closed, "Monster" continued in Eagle for some years.
The Nightcomers —  about a haunted house that killed a husband-and-wife investigator team - their children were drawn to the house to continue the investigation. Written by Tom Tully, with art by John Richardson
Tales from the Grave —  short stories illustrating the depravity of Victorian era London.
Terror of the Cats —  an ill-fated experiment to harness the psychic energy of cats resulted in local cats becoming enraged and attacking people in a small town. This too was written by Simon Furman.

 Editor 
Scream! was edited by Barrie Tomlinson, Ian Rimmer and Simon Furman, but in the tradition of counterparts such as 2000 AD and Tornado it was claimed to be edited by its fictional host, Ghastly McNasty. Rimmer claims to have taken inspiration for the name Ghastly McNasty from a Liverpool band called Filthy McNasty. Ghastly's face was concealed by a hood, and a regular feature of the comic involved readers sending in drawings of what they believed he looked like.

Cancellation
Despite fan speculation that Scream! was cancelled due to complaints from the public the reason it, along with five other IPC titles, ceased publication was in response to an industrial dispute. It subsequently merged with Eagle (#128, 1 September 1984) to form Eagle and Scream!, in which the series Monster and The Thirteenth Floor were continued. There were also five seasonal halloween specials released from 1985 to 1989, mostly consisting of reprints of horror-themed stories from IPC's back catalogue.

Collected editions
Monster, The Dracula File, and The Thirteenth Floor have been collected in the following omnibuses by Rebellion Publishing:

2017 specials revival
After Rebellion Developments acquired the rights to the stories, a Scream! & Misty Halloween Special was published in October 2017. This included all-new stories based on characters from both comics. Following the success of this one-off a second special was produced in 2018. This one, however, had a choice of covers where readers could opt for either Scream! & Misty or Misty & Scream! This followed some debate online about how the Misty logo was much smaller than the Scream! logo on the 2017 special with Pat Mills (creator of Misty) feeling that it made Misty seem like a "poor relation" and that Rebellion perhaps didn't understand the female market. The 2017 special eventually had a Misty & Scream! variant made available, but only through specialist stores. In 2019 a further Scream! special was produced but without the Scream! branding - an entire collection devoted to The Thirteenth Floor with new stories. Scream! and Misty did return in 2020 and this time there would only be one version of the cover with the title given as Misty and Scream! (with a separate Misty Winter Special 2020 also available). 2021 then saw what was marketed as a Scream! One-Shot Special in US comic book size under the title of Black Beth and the Devils of Al-Kadesh.

 Further reading 
 IT’S GHASTLY’ The untimely demise of Scream! (64 pages, Hibernia Comics, 2016)
 The Scream Comic Files

References

1984 comics debuts
Fleetway and IPC Comics titles
Horror comics
British comics
Defunct British comics